XL-413 is a drug which acts as a selective inhibitor of the enzyme cell division cycle 7-related protein kinase (CDC7). It is being researched for the treatment of some forms of cancer, and also has applications in genetic engineering.

References 

Experimental cancer drugs
Enzyme inhibitors
Genetic engineering